Batrahalli is a town in Krishnagiri district, Tamil Nadu, India.

Geography
It is located at an elevation of 394 m from MSL.

Location
National Highway 66 passes through Batrahalli. Nearest airports are Salem Airport and Bangalore International Airport; nearest railway stations are at Dasampatti and Samalpatti.

Places of interest
 Krishnagiri Dam
 Hanumanthathirtham

References

External links
 Satellite map of Batrahalli
 About Batrahalli

Villages in Krishnagiri district